Palacio de Deportes de Murcia is a sports arena in Murcia, Spain.   It is primarily used for basketball and Futsal and the home arena of CB Murcia and ElPozo Murcia FS. The arena holds 7,454 people and was built in 1994. It had a budget of 25 million dollars, and was the most modern arena in Europe the moment it was built.

Basketball attendances
This is a list of attendances of CB Murcia at Palacio de Deportes.

References

Murcia
Murcia
Murcia
Sports venues in the Region of Murcia
Sport in Murcia